There are many Roman sites in Great Britain that are open to the public.  There are also many sites that do not require special access, including Roman roads, and sites that have not been uncovered.

England
Hadrian's Wall, Northumberland and Cumbria
The Vallum ditch and mounds adjoining Hadrian's Wall. It was mistakenly attributed to Agricola before the late 19th century, but in fact was the work of Hadrian.
Batham Gate, Roman road
Dere Street, Roman road
Ermine Street, Roman road
Fosse Way, Roman road
Icknield Street, Roman Road
Stane Street (Chichester), Roman road
Stane Street (Colchester), Roman road
Stanegate, Roman road that pre-dates Hadrian's Wall
Watling Street, Roman road

Buckinghamshire
Bancroft Park, Milton Keynes. Romano-British villa
Magiovinium, Fenny Stratford, Milton Keynes

Cheshire
Deva Victrix, Chester
Chester Roman Amphitheatre
Roman Middlewich, King Street Roman Fort

Cumbria
Ambleside Roman Fort
Birdoswald Roman Fort (Banna). Part of Hadrian's Wall
Hardknott Roman Fort (Mediobogdum), Eskdale
Walls Castle (Roman Bath House), Ravenglass

Derbyshire
Aquae Arnemetiae (Roman Buxton)
Ardotalia (Melandra Castle)
Derventio Coritanorum (Roman Derby)
Doctor's Gate Roman road
Lutudarum (Wirksworth or Carsington)
Navio (Brough-on-Noe)
The Street Roman road

Devon
Isca Dumnoniorum (Roman Exeter). Parts of city wall still exist (overlaid with medieval construction)
Moridunum, Axminster
Pomeroy Wood
Woodbury Farm Roman Fort, near Axminster

Dorset
Durnovaria, Dorchester
Town Walks, Dorchester
Jordan Hill, Romano-Celtic Temple
Nunnery Mead, Roman Villa
Waddon Hill, near Beaminster

Durham
Arbeia Roman Fort, South Shields
Binchester Roman Fort, (called Vinovia by the Romans), Roman fort north of Bishop Auckland
Concangis, Chester-Le-Street
Longovicium, Lanchester, Roman fort with reservoirs, dams and aqueducts
Piercebridge Roman Bridge, next to Piercebridge Roman Fort, Piercebridge
Piercebridge Roman Fort, Piercebridge
Vinovia, (Binchester Roman Fort), Roman fort north of Bishop Auckland
Vindomora, Roman fort at Ebchester

East Sussex
Pevensey Roman Fort (Anderitum), Pevensey

Essex
 Belgic oppidum (Roman Braintree)
 Caesaromagus (Roman Chelmsford). A Roman fort was built in AD 60, and a civilian town grew up around it. The town was given the name of Caesaromagus (the market place of Caesar), although the reason for it being given the great honour of bearing the Imperial prefix is now unclear – possibly as a failed 'planned town' provincial capital to replace Londinium or Camulodunum.
Camulodunum (Roman Colchester). Oldest Roman wall in Britain, best-preserved Roman gateway in Britain, remains of two Roman theatres, oldest Roman church in UK and Castle museum
 Great Dunmow
 Heybridge, Maldon (Anglo-Saxon: Tidwalditun)
 Othona (Roman Bradwell-on-Sea)

Gloucestershire
Chedworth Roman Villa, near Cheltenham
Corinium Dobunnorum, Cirencester
Great Witcombe Roman Villa
Glevum (Roman Gloucester). Colonia Nervia Glevensium, Roman walls
Lydney Park. Romano-Celtic Temple
Uley
Woodchester Roman Villa, Woodchester, near Stroud

Greater Manchester
Mamucium, Castlefield inner city conservation site, Manchester
Coccium, near Wigan
Rigodunum, Castleshaw

Hampshire
Calleva Atrebatum, Silchester
Portchester Roman Fort (Portus Adurni), Portchester
Rockbourne Roman Villa, Fordingbridge
Sparsholt Roman Villa
Venta Belgarum, Winchester

Herefordshire
Ariconium, Bury Hill, Weston under Penyard
Blackwardine
Bravonium, Leintwardine
Buckton Roman Fort, near Leintwardine
Jay Lane, Leintwardine
Magnae Dobunnorum, Kenchester
The Weir Garden, River Wye

Hertfordshire
Braughing Roman Town (Roman Braughing)
Gadebridge Park Roman Villa
Verulamium, near St Albans
Welwyn Roman baths (part of Dicket Mead Villa)

Isle of Wight
Brading Roman Villa
Newport Roman Villa

Kent
Crofton Roman Villa, Orpington
Dubris (Roman Dover)
Lullingstone Roman Villa
Reculver Roman Fort, Reculver
Rutupiæ (Roman Richborough)

Leicestershire
High Cross, meeting point of Roman roads
Jewry Wall, Leicester

Lancashire
Bremetennacum, Ribchester
Lancaster Roman Fort, possibly Galacum
Over Burrow Roman Fort, possibly Ptolemy's 
Burscough Roman fort, Burscough

Lincolnshire

Lincoln (Lindum Colonia), important Roman Colonia and capital of the province of Flavia Caesariensis
Bourne-Morton Canal (visible only as alignment and crop marks)
Caistor, Roman town and fort. 
Car Dyke
Foss Dyke, Roman canal between Lincoln and the River Trent
Horncastle, Roman town and fort. Parts of the Roman walls remain.
Newport Arch, Lincoln
Sleaford, important Roman town.

London
Londinium (modern London)
London Wall, London
Temple of Mithras
Amphitheatre at Guildhall, London

Norfolk
Branodunum
Burgh Castle
Caister-on-Sea
Caistor St. Edmund
Gariannonum

Northamptonshire
Bannaventa, Norton, Northamptonshire
Borough Hill Roman villa, Daventry
Lactodurum, Towcester
Piddington Roman Villa
Whitehall Farm Roman villa excavated in Nether Heyford, now re-buried

Northumberland
Aesica, Roman fort, north of Haltwhistle
Bremenium, High Rochester
Carrawburgh, Mithraeum temple by Hadrian's Wall
Chesters Bridge, Roman bridge abutment by Chesters Roman Fort (Cilurnum), Northumberland
Chew Green, Roman Camps in the Cheviots
Cilurnum, Northumberland
Coria, Corbridge. Roman site and museum
Devil's Causeway, Roman road to Berwick upon Tweed
Featherwood Roman Camps, on Dere Street between Chew Green and Bremenium
Habitancum, Roman fort at Risingham
Housesteads (Vercovicium)
Hunnum, (also known as Onnum, and with the modern name of Haltonchesters), Roman fort north of Halton
Lees Hall Roman Camp near Haltwhistle
Magnis (Carvoran Roman Fort)
Roman Army Museum north of Haltwhistle at Carvoran
Vercovicium, (or Housesteads Roman Fort) was an auxiliary fort on Hadrian's Wall
Vindolanda, a fort on the Stanegate Roman road pre-dating Hadrian's Wall nearby, with exceptional Roman finds in its museum
Vindobala, Roman fort at Rudchester
Whitley Castle, also known as Epiacum, a Roman fort at the southern edge of Northumberland on the Maiden Way Roman road,  with remarkable earthen ramparts

North Yorkshire
Eboracum
Elslack fort, possibly Olenacum
Isurium Brigantum

Nottinghamshire 

Ad Pontem (East Stoke)
Crocolana (Brough)
Margidunum
Segelocum or Agelocum (Littleborough)
Vernometum (Willoughby on the Wolds)

Oxfordshire 

Alchester
North Leigh Roman Villa

Shropshire
Viroconium Cornoviorum, Wroxeter

Somerset
Aquae Sulis (Roman Bath)
Burrington
Charterhouse Roman Town and Mining Settlement
Dolebury Warren
Ham Hill
Lindinis (Roman Ilchester)
Low Ham Roman Villa
Pagans Hill, Romano-Celtic Temple
Roman Baths, Bath

South Yorkshire

Templeborough

Staffordshire
Letocetum, near Lichfield

Sussex
See East Sussex, West Sussex

Tyne and Wear
Segedunum Roman Fort, Wallsend
Arbeia Roman Fort, South Shields
Extensive Roman collection in Great North Museum, Newcastle upon Tyne

Warwickshire
Lunt Fort, near Coventry
Tripontium, near Rugby

West Midlands
Metchley Fort, Birmingham

West Sussex
Bignor Roman Villa, Pulborough
Fishbourne Roman Palace, Fishbourne, West Sussex
Noviomagus Reginorum (Roman Chichester)

West Yorkshire
Lagentium, Castleford
Slack, Huddersfield
Burgodunum, Adel (Leeds)

Wiltshire
Cunetio, Mildenhall
Littlecote Roman Villa

Worcestershire 
Overbury

Scotland
Antonine Wall
Auchendavy
Bar Hill Fort
Bothwellhaugh Roman Fort, North Lanarkshire
Castlehill Fort
Croy Hill
Inchtuthil, Perth and Kinross
Mumrills
Seabegs Wood
Trimontium, Newstead, Melrose, Scottish Borders
Watling Lodge
Roman Bath House, Bearsden
Rough Castle Fort, near Tamfourhill
Cramond Roman Fort excavations
Cawdor (Roman Fort), near Inverness
Inveresk Mithreum, by Musselburgh, near Edinburgh, link: https://www.cambridge.org/core/journals/britannia/article/mithras-in-scotland-a-mithraeum-at-inveresk-east-lothian/544B6233F7F06415EE049C60A827C3C0

Wales
Abergavenny Roman fort, Gobannium
Alabum Llandovery Roman fort
Blestium Monmouth Roman fort
Caer Gybi, Anglesey Roman fort
Caerleon, Newport, Monmouthshire Roman fortress and amphitheatre
Caersws Roman Forts, Powys
Caerwent, Monmouthshire. Roman town - the only one in Wales
Cardiff Roman Fort
Cold Knap, Barry
Cowbridge Roman Town probably Bovium
Dolaucothi Gold Mines, Carmarthenshire. Fort, settlement and museum.
Gelligaer small Roman fort
Gateholm, Pembrokeshire
Llan Ffestiniog, Gwynedd fort & amphitheatre
Luentinum Roman fort at Pumsaint, Carmarthenshire
Moridunum, Carmarthen
Nidum, Neath, Glamorgan. Roman fort
Penydarren, Merthyr Tydfil. Roman fort
Sarn Helen Roman road
Segontium Roman Fort, Caernarfon
Usk Burrium early legionary base
Y Gaer, Brecon cavalry base

See also

 List of Roman place names in Britain
 List of Latin place names in Britain
 Roman Britain
 Sub-Roman Britain
 Roman Scotland
 Roman Wales
 Romano-Celtic Temple
 Roman sites in Britain KMZ file

References

 Roman sites
Articles containing video clips